Mukti was one of the important weekly newspaper of Purulia of West Bengal. It started publishing in 1925 from the Purulia town and later from the eastern manbhum district of then Bihar. It was published as a part of "Silpashram", a Gandhian Ashram. This newspaper has great importance in representing the local history from in its inception.

Editors
These peoples have been editors of 'Mukti'.

References

Bengali-language newspapers published in India
Defunct newspapers published in India
Mass media in West Bengal
Publications established in 1925
1925 establishments in India
Purulia